The 1st constituency of Meurthe-et-Moselle is a French legislative constituency in the Meurthe-et-Moselle département.

Description

Meurthe-et-Moselle's 1st constituency contains most of the city of Nancy and its northern suburbs including Seichamps at is eastern extremity.

From 1988 to 2017 the seat swang between the Radical Party and the Socialist Party.

Historic Representation

Election results

2022 

 
 
|-
| colspan="8" bgcolor="#E9E9E9"|
|-

2017

2012

 
 
 
 
 
|-
| colspan="8" bgcolor="#E9E9E9"|
|-

Sources
Official results of French elections from 2002: "Résultats électoraux officiels en France" (in French).

1